This is a list of manga that topped The New York Times Manga Best Seller list in 2013.

See also
 The New York Times Fiction Best Sellers of 2013
 The New York Times Non-Fiction Best Sellers of 2013

References

2013
2013 in the United States
2013 in comics
Lists of manga